Fred von Bernewitz (born December 10, 1938, Washington, D.C.) is a film editor, currently with HBO. His work in film editing over four decades ranges from TV commercials to features, including several films by Robert Downey Sr.

Career
Interviewed in 2008 by the film critic Stuart Klawans for The New York Times, Downey recalled obtaining a camera and working with Bernewitz during the 1960s:

Tales of Terror!
With Grant Geissman, Bernewitz is the co-author of Tales of Terror! The EC Companion (Gemstone Publishing/Fantagraphics Books, 2000). In Rambles, Chet Williamson reviewed Tales of Terror!:

Bernewitz compiled the original edition of The Complete EC Checklist (1955). The first index to EC Comics, it has been reprinted several times with updates, and it served as a basis for Tales of Terror! For Mad publisher Bill Gaines, he compiled three volumes of The Complete Mad Checklist (1961, 1964, 1970).

See also
List of Entertaining Comics publications

References

External links
Time: "That Old Feeling": Richard Corliss on Fred von Bernewitz

American non-fiction writers
Living people
1938 births
EC Comics
American film editors